The Tipperary Intermediate Football Championship is an annual Gaelic football competition organised since 1974 by the Tipperary County Board of the Gaelic Athletic Association for the second-tier Gaelic football clubs in  County Tipperary in Ireland. The series of games are played during the summer and autumn months with the county final usually being played in October. The championship has been played on a regional basis, whereby the respective champions from the Mid, North, South and West championships contested the county series of games. Now it is an all County 4 Group stage followed by knock out. The winning Club will receive the Barrett Cup. 

The Tipperary County Championship is an integral part of the wider Munster Intermediate Club Football Championship. The winners of the Tipperary county final join the champions of the other Gaelic football counties to contest the provincial championship.

The title has been won at least once by 31 different clubs.

Roll of honour

References

External links
 Tipperary GAA Archive
 Tipperary club titles on Hogan Stand

Gaelic football competitions in Munster
football
2